First-seeded Ai Sugiyama was the defending champion and won in the final 6–3, 6–3 against Corina Morariu.

Seeds
A champion seed is indicated in bold text while text in italics indicates the round in which that seed was eliminated. The top two seeds received a bye to the second round.

  Ai Sugiyama (champion)
  Naoko Sawamatsu (quarterfinals)
  Tamarine Tanasugarn (second round)
  Amy Frazier (semifinals)
  Corina Morariu (final)
  Shi-Ting Wang (semifinals)
  Miho Saeki (first round)
  Yuka Yoshida (second round)

Draw

Final

Section 1

Section 2

External links
 1998 Japan Open Tennis Championships Draw

Singles